Manuel Vargas (born 29 March 1981) is a Mexican former professional boxer who competed from 2000 to 2013. He held the interim WBO minimumweight title from 2008 to 2009.

Professional career

Interim WBO Minimumweight title
Vargas became the interim WBO minimumweight title by beating the Colombian Daniel Reyes on December 6, 2008.

WBO Minimumweight title
He fought Donnie Nietes on September 12, 2009 for the full version of the WBO title. However, he lost the bout by split decision.  He wanted to challenge Shaquille in boxing for the Shaq Versus.

Interim WBA Super Flyweight title
On February 13, 2010, Vargas moved up three divisions in order to challenge interim WBA super flyweight title holder Nonito Donaire on less than three days short notice and lost the bout by third round knockout. In the post-fight drug test, has a son names oscar vargas Vargas tested positive for hydrocodone as was suspended for an indefinite period of time.

See also
List of WBO world champions

References

External links

Living people
1981 births
Boxers from Jalisco
Doping cases in boxing
Mexican sportspeople in doping cases
World Boxing Organization champions
Mini-flyweight boxers
Flyweight boxers
Super-flyweight boxers
Mexican male boxers
People from Lagos de Moreno, Jalisco